The 6th district of the Iowa Senate is located in Northwestern Iowa. It is currently composed of Audubon, Buena Vista, Carroll, Crawford and Sac counties.

Current elected officials
Craig Williams is the senator currently representing the 6th District.

The area of the 6th District contains two Iowa House of Representatives districts:
The 11th District (represented by Gary Worthan)
The 12th District (represented by Brian Best)

The district is also located in Iowa's 4th congressional district, which is represented by U.S. Representative Randy Feenstra.

Past senators
The district has previously been represented by:

William M. Reed, 1856–1859
James C. Hagans, 1860–1863
C. G. Bridges, 1864–1867
Edward M. Bill, 1868–1869
James D. Wright, 1870–1871
Robert A. Dague, 1872–1875
Samuel L. Bestow, 1876–1877
Frederick Joseph Teale, 1878–1879
Isaac W. Keller, 1880–1883
Anson P. Stephens, 1884–1887
George L. Finn, 1888–1895
William O. Mitchell, 1896–1899
F. L. Arthaud, 1900–1904
Daniel W. Turner, 1904–1908
Theophilus W. Bennett, 1909–1912
Albert D. Nye, 1913–1918
Benjamin J. Gibson, 1917–1918
F. E. Shane, 1919–1920
J. C. Tuck, 1921–1924
S. E. Fackler, 1925–1928
Arthur Leonard, 1929–1932
Claude Stanley, 1933–1934
O. J. Kirketag, 1937–1940
Oliver Turner, 1941–1944
O. J. Kirketag, 1945–1946
Kathlyn M. Kirketag, 1947–1948
Ernest L. Humbert, 1949–1952
Thomas C. Larson, 1953–1956
Francis A. Turner, 1957–1960
Orval C. Walter, 1961–1963
Vern Lisle, 1963–1969
Earl G. Bass, 1970
George L. Shawver, 1971–1972
Kenneth D. Scott, 1973–1976
Alvin V. Miller, 1977–1982
Lee Warren Holt, 1983–1988
John P. Kibbie, 1989–1992
Wayne D. Bennett, 1993–1996
Steve King, 1997–2002
E. Thurman Gaskill, 2003–2008
Merlin Bartz, 2009–2012
Mark Segebart, 2013–2021
Craig Williams, 2021–present

See also
Iowa General Assembly
Iowa Senate

References

06